River class may refer to:

Destroyers
 , ships of the Royal Navy built in the early 20th century that served in World War I
 , ships of the Royal Canadian Navy that served in World War II
 , frigates built for the Royal Australian Navy post World War II
 , ships of the Royal Australian Navy that served in World War I

Other ships
 , ships of World War II built for the Royal Navy, Royal Canadian Navy and other navies
 , former ships of the Royal Navy commissioned in the 1980s
 , ships of the modern Royal Navy
 , ships of the interwar Royal Navy that saw service in World War II
 , ships of the South African Navy

Railway locomotives 
 River class locomotive (disambiguation)

See also
 International Scale of River Difficulty